The 1848 United States presidential election in Vermont took place on November 7, 1848, as part of the 1848 United States presidential election. Voters chose six representatives, or electors to the Electoral College, who voted for President and Vice President.

Vermont voted for the Whig candidate, Zachary Taylor, over Free Soil candidate, former president Martin Van Buren, and Democratic candidate Lewis Cass. Taylor won the state by a margin of 19.4%. 

This would be the first presidential election in Vermont where a third party candidate carried second place. Van Buren did somewhat better in Vermont in this election than he did in 1840. Van Buren received 13,887 popular votes with 28.87% of the vote in 1848 compared to 1840, where he only received 35.47% of the popular vote with 18,009 votes when he lost to Whig candidate William Henry Harrison, who received 63.9% of the popular vote with 32,445 votes. Vermont would prove to be Van Buren's strongest state in the election.

While Cass won Washington County and Van Buren won Lamoille County, this would be the last presidential election in Vermont until 1912 where a Democratic candidate would carry at least one county in the state.

Results

See also
 United States presidential elections in Vermont

References

Vermont
1848
1848 Vermont elections